Gustaf Wallenberg may refer to:

 Gustaf Wally (1905–1966), real name Gustaf Wallenberg, actor and theatre manager
 Gustaf Wallenberg (1863–1937), diplomat, see Wallenberg family